2-hydroxychromene-2-carboxylate isomerase (HCCA isomerase, 2HC2CA isomerase, 2-hydroxychromene-2-carboxylic acid isomerase) is an enzyme with systematic name 2-hydroxy-2H-chromene-2-carboxylate---(3E)-4-(2-hydroxyphenyl)-2-oxobut-3-enoate isomerase. This enzyme catalyses the following chemical reaction

 2-hydroxy-2H-chromene-2-carboxylate  (3E)-4-(2-hydroxyphenyl)-2-oxobut-3-enoate

This enzyme is involved in naphthalene degradation.

References

External links 
 

EC 5.99.1